The Spice Islands typically refers to the Molucca Archipelago in the modern Indonesian provinces of Maluku and North Maluku. Historically, this lucrative part of the (Dutch) East Indies also included other nearby islands, including Sulawesi (Celebes).

It occasionally also referred to the Zanzibar Archipelago including Pemba off East Africa.

Spice Island, Island of Spice, or Spice Isle may also refer to either
 Grenada in the Antilles
 Portsmouth Point

Other 
 Spice Islands, an American brand of spice